John White is a Canadian politician, who was elected to the Nova Scotia House of Assembly in the 2021 Nova Scotia general election. He represents the riding of Glace Bay-Dominion as a member of the Progressive Conservative Association of Nova Scotia.

He is a mental health professional and Chair of the Nova Scotia Critical Incident Stress Management Team.

References

Year of birth missing (living people)
Living people
Progressive Conservative Association of Nova Scotia MLAs
21st-century Canadian politicians
People from the Cape Breton Regional Municipality